Aashay Mishra is an Indian television actor who is best known as Vaibhav Toshniwal in Shubh Laabh - Aapkey Ghar Mein and now notably as Satvik Bhosle in Agnisakshi…Ek Samjhauta.

Career

Debut and early career (2017–2019)
Mishra started his career in a theatre company of Nadira Babbar. While he was working as the lead in the play Jhumru Aur Jhumri, he had to leave the play in-between in order to act in an advertisement for Paytm, from where his true acting career began.

Breakthrough and success (2019–present)
In 2019, he made his television debut with the lead role of Omkar Gupta in Pyaar Ke Papad. From 2020–2021, he played the lead role of Sarangdhar "Sarang" Pandey in Sony TV series Story 9 Months Ki. From 2021–2022, he was seen as the lead Vaibhav Toshniwal opposite Tanisha Mehta in Sony Sab series Shubh Laabh - Aapkey Ghar Mein.

Since 2023, he is playing the lead role of Satvik Bhosle opposite Shivika Pathak in Colors TV show Agnisakshi…Ek Samjhauta.

Filmography

Television

Films

See also 

 List of Indian actors
 List of Indian television actors

References

External links 
 

Living people
Indian television actors
Indian male soap opera actors
21st-century Indian male actors
Indian male television actors
Male actors in Hindi television
People from Chhattisgarh
Actors from Chhattisgarh
Year of birth missing (living people)